Sir William Papworth (c. 1331 – 4 September 1414), of Grafham (then in Huntingdonshire, now Cambridgeshire) and Papworth St. Agnes (Cambridgeshire), was an English politician.

He was a Member (MP) of the Parliament of England for Cambridgeshire in 1372, 1381, May 1382 and 1386; and for Huntingdonshire in 1385.

References

1331 births
1414 deaths
English MPs 1372
People from Huntingdonshire
English MPs 1381
English MPs May 1382
English MPs 1386
English MPs 1385